Whips have managed business and maintained party discipline for Australia's federal political parties in the Senate since Federation. The term has origins in the British parliamentary system.

Though the Remuneration Tribunal and parliamentary website refer to the senior Labor and Liberal whips as "chief" whips and their junior whips as "deputy whips", the parties tend to refer to the senior whips as "whips" when announcing their officeholders to the Senate. A number of Senate whips have gone on to serve as ministers, and several as Leader of the Government or Leader of the Opposition in the Senate.

Australian Labor Party

In addition to those below, Kay Denman served as a deputy whip from 18 September to 31 December 1995, a period when one of Labor's two whips was on leave of absence while conducting parliamentary business overseas.

Notes

Coalition

Liberal Party of Australia

Notes

National Country Party/National Party of Australia

Australian Greens

Western Australian Greens
In May 1996, following the 1996 election, the two members of the Western Australian Greens in the Senate announced they were to be whip and deputy whip of their party. The deputy whip, Christabel Chamarette, had lost her seat at the election, and left the Senate just over a month after the announcement. The party lost its other seat (and its whip) at the 1998 election, with her leaving office in June 1999. The party only merged with the Australian Greens in 2003, after it lost its senators.

Australian Greens

The Australian Greens appointed their first whip in the Senate when the party increased from two to four members in 2005. She became entitled to a salary when the party increased to five members in 2008.

Pauline Hanson's One Nation
One Nation first entered the Senate in 1999, but had only one seat and consequently did not elect a whip. The party's senator was defeated in 2004 and left the Senate in 2005. In 2016, four One Nation senators were elected, and the party elected a whip for the first time.

Nick Xenophon Team
Senator Nick Xenophon entered the Senate as an independent in 2008. In 2016 he ran as part of the Nick Xenophon Team, which saw Xenophon and two of his running mates (and a lower house MP) elected, so the Nick Xenophon Team elected a whip.

Democratic Labour Party
The Democratic Labour Party (until 2013 the Democratic Labor Party) elected its first whip in 1968, when its membership increased from two to four. The party continued to do so until 1974, when the party lost all its seats at the double dissolution election. The party re-entered the Senate following the 2010 election, but did not have a whip as it only had one senator, who left the party in 2014.

Palmer United Party
The Palmer United Party won three Senate seats at the 2013 election, the new senators taking their seats on 1 July 2014. Two of the three had left within a year, but the remaining senator retained the position of whip until his defeat in 2016.

Defunct

Free Trade/Anti-Socialist Party (1901–09)

Protectionist Party (1901–09)

Commonwealth Liberal Party (1909–17)

National Labor (1916–17)

Nationalist Party of Australia (1917–31)

United Australia Party (1931–45)

Australian Democrats (1977–2015)
The Australian Democrats first elected a whip in 1981, reflecting an increase from two to five of the party's Senate membership. The party lost all its seats at the 2007 election, and its senators duly left their seats the following June.

Notes

References

Lists of Australian politicians
Lists of political office-holders in Australia
Members of the Australian Senate
Opposition of Australia
Parliament of Australia
Political whips